Diaphus mollis, the soft lanternfish, is a species of lanternfish 
found in the Atlantic and Indian Oceans.

Size

References

Myctophidae
Taxa named by Åge Vedel Tåning
Fish described in 1928